The Vector W2 was a fully functional concept car intended for production constructed by Vector Motors in 1978. It had a Bosch fuel injected twin-turbocharged 350 cid (5.7 L) aluminum Chevrolet V8 engine that produced over 600 hp (450 kW) and over 600 ft·lbf (800 N·m) of torque. The top speed was a claimed 242 mph (389 km/h).

The name comes from the "W" for Jerry Wiegert (designer and founder of Vector Motors) and "2" for the number of turbochargers. Over the time prior to production the car went through a number of improvements in performance, technology, updated styling exercises, as well as color changes. The car was displayed at international auto shows worldwide, and featured in many automotive publications. Between 1978 and 1987, Wiegert attempted to raise the money to start series of the car. In 1989, the final version of the W2 went into production as the Vector W8.

Currently, the Vector W2 prototype is inoperable, but is slated for restoration.

Notes
The Vector W2 was used in the Remington Steele episode "License to Steele"; portrayed as the product of a fictional car company, it was called the Hunter Jet Star 6000.

The Vector W8 was featured in the 1993 movie Rising Sun starring Sean Connery and Wesley Snipes.

The Vector was also featured as a vehicle in the Nintendo game Formula One: Built to Win.

References

Concept cars
Vector Motors
Cars introduced in 1978